Thomas Ashley Cairns JP (1854 – 3 September 1908) was a British Liberal Party politician who served as a Member of Parliament (MP) for Newcastle-upon-Tyne from the 1906 general election until his death two years later due to diabetes, aged 69.

Background
Cairns was born in Sunderland, the son of Thomas Cairns of Forfarshire. He was educated privately. In 1880 he married Isabella Dixon.

Professional career
Cairns was chief partner of Cairns, Noble & Co., shipowners and merchants. He was Vice President of the Shipowners International Association.

Political career
Cairns was a member of the Newcastle School Board from 1892 to 1899. He was elected to Newcastle City Council in 1896. He was appointed as a Justice of the peace for Newcastle. He was active in the Liberal Party as Vice Chairman of the Executive Committee of the Northern Liberal Federation. He was Liberal candidate for the two member Newcastle-upon-Tyne division at the 1906 General Election. He ran in tandem with a labour candidate and together they took both seats from the Conservatives. Cairns was in favour of housing reform, social legislation and Women's suffrage.

Electoral record

References

External links

1854 births
1908 deaths
Liberal Party (UK) MPs for English constituencies
UK MPs 1906–1910